Marshall Islands competed at the 2017 Asian Indoor and Martial Arts Games held in Ashgabat, Turkmenistan from September 17 to 27. Marshall Islands sent a delegation consisting of 10 athletes competing in 4 different sports. Mattie Sasser was the only medalist in the event for the Marshall Islands as she claimed the silver medal in the women's under 63 kg category.

Marshall Islands made its debut in an Asian Indoor and Martial Arts Games for the first time at the Games held in Turkmenistan along with other Oceania nations.

Participants

Medallists

References 

Nations at the 2017 Asian Indoor and Martial Arts Games
Asian